Birds, Beasts, Bugs & Fishes (Little & Big) is a 1998 compilation album by Pete Seeger and was released on Smithsonian Folkways as SFW45039.

This collection is a compilation of 28 songs and stories about animals Pete Seeger released in 1955 on two short LP records on Folkways Records as Birds, Beasts, Bugs and Little Fishes and Birds, Beasts, Bugs and Bigger Fishes as Folkways FC 7610 and FC 7611.

Track listing

Notes
Tracks 1-15 is Birds, Beasts, Bugs And Little Fishes
Tracks 16-28 is Birds, Beasts, Bugs And Bigger Fishes

Personnel 
Production coordinator – Mary Monseur, Michael Maloney
Mastered – Charlie Pilzer
Editorial assistance – Carla Borden, Peter Seitel
Producer – Moses Asch
Remastered – Joe Brescio
Audio supervised – Pete Reiniger
Production supervised – Amy Horowitz and Anthony Seeger

References

1998 albums
Pete Seeger albums
Smithsonian Folkways albums